Mayling Ng is a British actress based in the United States. She played Orana in Wonder Woman, and Mongal in The Suicide Squad.

Early life 
Ng was born in the United Kingdom to a Singaporean-Chinese father and British mother. She spent her early years in Tenerife, Canary Islands and went to Calderstones School in Liverpool before the family moved to Spain and then Singapore. They then moved to California, where Ng is based.

Career 
Mayling is an actress, personal trainer, fitness model, and entrepreneur. She received the Barclays Entrepreneur Award for her Lyte protein restaurant concept and opened three locations in Spain before moving to Singapore where she founded her own fitness and personal training company while becoming a competitive athlete.

Filmography

Film

References 

Year of birth missing (living people)
Living people
British expatriates in the United States
21st-century English actresses
English film actresses